Korra Bujurg is a village in the Baberu tehsil, Banda district, Uttar Pradesh state, India.

References

Villages in Banda district, India